Candelariella vitellina is a common and widespread green-yellow to orange-yellow crustose areolate lichen that grows on rock, wood, and bark, all over the world. It grows on non-calcareous rock, wood, and bark. It often has tiny lobate areoles in the shape of lion claws. The areoles may be flat or convex. Its sexual reproduction structures (apothecia) are a 0.35–1.0 mm-wide disc, darker yellow than the thallus, rimmed with thallus-like tissue lecanorine, flat but becoming convex with age. Lichen spot tests are K+ reddish, KC−, and C−. It produces calycin, pulvinic acid, pulvinic dilactone and vulpinic acid as secondary metabolites.

In California, it prefers growing on granite, but can also be found on wood (rarely on bark) and other kinds of rock.

Candelariella vitellina looks like a miniature version of C. rosulans. It can be distinguished by C. vitanela having a visible exciple (the rim around the apothecia disc), which C. rosulans does not have. It is usually much larger and thicker than the similar C. lutella.

It is a known host to the lichenicolous fungus species Carbonea vitellinaria.

References

vitellina
Lichen species
Lichens described in 1785
Lichens of North America
Taxa named by Jakob Friedrich Ehrhart